Park Hong-kyun is a South Korean director. He made his debut in 2002 on Bestseller Theater - Sinchoneseo Yuteonhada .

List of work

References

1970 births
Living people
South Korean television directors
Place of birth missing (living people)
Seoul National University alumni